Idnea felicella is a species of snout moth in the genus Idnea. It was described by Harrison Gray Dyar Jr. in 1913, and is known from Guyana.

References

Moths described in 1913
Chrysauginae